Lucas Prisor (born 23 September 1983) is a German actor.

Life and career
Prisor was born in Hannover, Germany. During his school career he spent one year in New York City. After graduating he studied acting in Leipzig, before moving to Berlin to work at the Berliner Ensemble and at the Volksbühne.

He also lived in Paris where he started to work with French director François Ozon, academy award winner Volker Schlöndorff and Paul Verhoeven.

He lives in Berlin and Paris.

Filmography 
 2013: Un village français by Jean-Marc Brondolo
 2013: Jeune et jolie by François Ozon
 2013:  by 
 2014: Un Tour de Cheville by Guillaume Levil
 2014: Diplomacy (film) by Volker Schlöndorff
 2014: Die Pilgerin by Philipp Kadelbach
 2015: Die Himmelsleiter by Carlo Rola
 2015: Tatort - Wer Wind erntet, sät Sturm by Florian Baxmeyer
 2015: Lotte Jäger und das tote Mädchen by Sherry Hormann
 2016: Elle by Paul Verhoeven
 2017: Un sac de billes by Christian Duguay
 2017: Charité
 2017: Our Patriots by Gabriel Le Bomin
 2017: War Photographer by Bernd Wunder
 2018: Friendly Fire by Daphne Charizani
 2019: My Zoë by Julie Delpy

Theatre 
 2009: "Das Abenteuerliche Herz: Droge und Rausch" directed by Martin Wuttke (Berliner Ensemble)
 2009: "Trilogie der schönen Ferienzeit" directed by Claus Peymann (Berliner Ensemble)
 2009: "Leonce and Lena" directed by Robert Wilson (director) (Berliner Ensemble)
 2009: "Nathan the Wise" directed by Claus Peymann (Berliner Ensemble)
 2010: "Oedipus at Colonus" directed by Peter Stein (Salzburger Festspiele)
 2011: "A Streetcar Named Desire (play)" directed by Thomas Langhoff (Berliner Ensemble)
 2011: "Die Sonne" directed by Olivier Py (Volksbühne Berlin and Odeon Theatre Paris)
 2016: "Lear (opera)" directed by Calixto Bieito (Opera of Paris)

External links

References

German male actors
1983 births
Living people